"Josip Broz Tito" High School is a state high school in the center of the capital of North Macedonia, Skopje. The school is located at a 5-minute-walk distance from the main square Macedonia. The school, which bears the name of Josip Broz Tito – the first president of Yugoslavia, is one of the biggest and most elite state-owned schools in Skopje. It offers IB courses, as well as courses for the usual Matura programmes.

Notable alumni
Aleksandar Mitevski, singer and music producer
Darko Dimitrov, film director
Igor Dzhambazov, showman and actor
Vlado Buchkovski, former prime minister of North Macedonia

References

External links
 Official portal of the City of Skopje

High schools in North Macedonia
Schools in North Macedonia
Centar Municipality, North Macedonia
Cultural depictions of Josip Broz Tito